Madelaine Grobbelaar Petsch (born August 18, 1994) is an American actress and YouTuber. She is known for portraying Cheryl Blossom on The CW television series Riverdale and Marissa in F the Prom.

Early life
Petsch was born on August 18, 1994, in Port Orchard, Washington. At the age of three, she began dance classes, and two years later enrolled in theater classes. Petsch's parents are from South Africa, and she spent the first ten years of her life dividing her time between South Africa and the state of Washington. She attended the Tacoma School of the Arts and relocated to Los Angeles after graduating. Petsch has one older brother.

Career
Petsch appeared in a national advertising campaign for Coca-Cola in 2014. In February 2016, she was cast as Cheryl Blossom in The CW's Riverdale, having been pinned for the role since late 2015 after meeting the casting director, who was at the time working on Legends of Tomorrow. The series began filming in September of that year and premiered on January 26, 2017. In March 2017, she joined the cast of the film Polaroid, which was released in 2019. In January 2019, it was announced that Petsch would star in and executive produce the horror-comedy film Saint Clare; but in 2022, Bella Thorne took over the role.

In April 2018, Petsch collaborated with sunglasses company Privé Revaux and released her own collection of sunglasses. Petsch has a YouTube channel, stating that the inspiration to start one was so fans could know the real her outside of acting.

Personal life
At age 14, she began speaking out as a vegan, after having been raised vegetarian. She has also participated in an awareness campaign for PETA.

Filmography

Music videos
 "Malibu" (2020, at home edition) by Kim Petras

Awards and nominations

References

External links

 

1994 births
21st-century American actresses
Actresses from Washington (state)
American people of South African descent
American television actresses
American YouTubers
Living people
People from Port Orchard, Washington
Video bloggers
Women video bloggers